Vincenti is a surname. Notable people with the surname include:

Francesca Vincenti (born 1965), Maltese windsurfer
Giacomo Vincenti (died 1619), Italian bookseller and music printer
Gustavo R. Vincenti (1888–1974), Maltese architect and developer
Peter Vincenti (born 1986), Jersey footballer
Tomas De Vincenti (born 1989), Argentine footballer
Walter G. Vincenti (1917–2019), American aeronautics engineer
 Michele Vincenti (born 1958), Canadian Professor